O. Gösta A. Persson (8 January 1904 – 23 February 1991) was a Swedish freestyle swimmer and water polo player who competed in the 1924 Summer Olympics and in the 1936 Summer Olympics.

Persson was born in Stockholm on 8 January 1904.
In 1924 he won the bronze medal as member of the Swedish 4 x 200 metres freestyle relay team. He was also part of the Swedish team which finished fourth in the Olympic water polo tournament. He played all six matches.  Twelve years later he played four matches in the 1936 Olympic water polo tournament when the Swedish team finished in seventh place.

Persson died in Malmö on 23 February 1991.

References

Swedish male freestyle swimmers
Swedish male water polo players
Olympic swimmers of Sweden
Olympic water polo players of Sweden
Swimmers at the 1924 Summer Olympics
Water polo players at the 1924 Summer Olympics
Water polo players at the 1936 Summer Olympics
Olympic bronze medalists for Sweden
1904 births
1991 deaths
Sportspeople from Stockholm
Medalists at the 1924 Summer Olympics
20th-century Swedish people